Jacob Graham Bethell (born 23 October 2003) is a Barbadian born cricketer who plays for the England under 19s cricket team. Bethell was born in Barbados and moved to Warwickshire, England, when he was 12. He made his Twenty20 debut on 20 June 2021, for Warwickshire in the 2021 T20 Blast.

Early life and career
Bethell was born and raised in Barbados. He attended Harrison College, whose alumni include Sir Clyde Walcott, and was awarded player of the tournament in the West Indies Under-15 competition in 2017. Such performances earned him a scholarship at Rugby School, where he was coached by their director of cricket and former Warwickshire captain Mike Powell. He played cricket with Warwickshire from a young age, and Bethell signed a three-year professional contract with Warwickshire in January 2021. Former Warwickshire captain and England cricketer Ian Bell described Bethell as "the best 17-year old" he had ever seen. He made his List A debut on 22 July 2021, for Warwickshire in the 2021 Royal London One-Day Cup.

In September 2021, Bethell was named as the joint-captain of the England under-19 cricket team for their series against the West Indies. He made his first-class debut on 12 September 2021, for Warwickshire in the 2021 County Championship.

In December 2021, he was named as the vice-captain of England's team for the 2022 ICC Under-19 Cricket World Cup in the West Indies. In April 2022, he was bought by the Welsh Fire for the 2022 season of The Hundred.

References

External links
 

2003 births
Living people
Barbadian cricketers
Warwickshire cricketers
Gloucestershire cricketers
People educated at Harrison College (Barbados)
People educated at Rugby School
Welsh Fire cricketers